MAC (stylized as mac) (formerly Midlands Arts Centre) is a non-profit arts centre situated in Cannon Hill Park, Edgbaston, Birmingham, England. It was established in 1962 and is registered as an educational charity which hosts art exhibitions, Indie Cinema, live performances and Creative Courses for all ages.

The centre re-opened in May 2010 after a £15m facelift. It has four performance auditoria, rehearsal and media studios, a cinema, café, bar and art gallery. With 1,028,371 visits in 2015, MAC is the 14th most-visited free attractions in England.

History

The idea for an arts centre in Cannon Hill Park was the result of a meeting between local residents: theatre writer and director John English, his wife, Mollie Randle, and local politician Frank Price in the late 1950s. Eventually  of land in Cannon Hill Park was made available by Birmingham City Council in 1962 for this purpose. It also housed the Cannon Hill Puppet Theatre under John M. Blundall.

In 1965 director Mike Leigh went to work at the theatre and started experimenting with the idea that writing and rehearsing could potentially be part of the same process. Between 1972 and 1987 it was the home of the former Birmingham Youth Theatre, a company aimed at encouraging and nurturing talent amongst people aged 15 to 23 who were not involved with drama or theatre. This company was founded by local teacher Derek Nicholls, who later became Director of the mac. Adrian Lester and Andrew Tiernan began their careers there.

Other artists who performed here include Yoko Ono, Kate Malone, and Ewen Henderson; and renowned musicians and bands such as Ruby Turner, Ocean Colour Scene, UB40, and ELO played at MAC in the early stages of their career. Indian classical dancer Nahid Siddiqui taught Kathak classes here, and famous Bharatanatyam exponent Chitra Bolar started teaching at MAC in 1978. Their contributions established MAC as a centre for South Asian dance and performing arts.

The centre closed from April 2008 to 1 May 2010 for a £14.8 million refurbishment.

References

External links

Music venues in Birmingham, West Midlands
Arts centres in England
Theatres in Birmingham, West Midlands
Art museums and galleries in Birmingham, West Midlands
Art galleries established in 1962